The Canadian Society of Pharmacology and Therapeutics (CSPT) is an academic association whose mission is the promotion of research and education in pharmacology and therapeutics in Canada.  It  comprises graduate students, postdoctoral fellows, established investigators and clinical scientists working in academia, clinical practice, government, and industry.  Despite being based in Canada and having a majority of Canadian members, this is not a condition of membership, and the Society has members from all over the world. The CSPT is the Canadian member of the International Union of Basic and Clinical Pharmacology.

Publications 
Canadian Journal of Clinical Pharmacology  
Canadian Journal of Physiology and Pharmacology

External links
 The society's website

Pharmacy organizations in Canada
Pharmacological societies